Carex chordorrhiza, commonly called creeping sedge or string sedge, is a species of perennial plant in the family Cyperaceae with Holarctic distribution growing in acidic bogs.

Growth form and classification
Carex chordorrhiza has an unusual growth habit, where prostrate stems produce new shoots the following year. This habit is considered so distinct from all other Carex species that C. chordorrhiza is placed in its own section, Carex sect. Chordorrhizae, although similar habits are seen in other species such as Carex limosa.

Description

Distribution
The distribution of Carex chordorrhiza is circumpolar in boreal and subarctic areas. It is found in Iceland, Scandinavia, northern Germany, Poland, northern Russia, and in North America from Alaska to Greenland, and occurs more patchily as far south as Indiana and the Pyrenees.

Within the British Isles, it is restricted to two sites in the Scottish Highlands, at the head of Loch Naver (near Altnaharra, West Sutherland) and in the Insh Marshes (Easterness & Nairns).

References

External links
Carex chordorrhiza, Flora of the Canadian Arctic
Carex chordorrhiza, Cyperaceae of the Canadian Arctic Archipelago
Carex chordorrhiza, Flora of Michigan

chordorrhiza
Flora of Europe
Flora of North America
Flora of Asia
Plants described in 1782
Flora of Greenland